"Superfly" is a song by Curtis Mayfield, the title track from his 1972 soundtrack album for the film of the same name. It was the second single released from the album, following "Freddie's Dead (Theme From Superfly)", and reached #8 on the Billboard Hot 100 and #5 on the Best Selling Soul Singles chart. The lyrics celebrate the craftiness and determination of the film's main character. The song plays over the film's closing credits.

The bassline and the rototom percussion break from the song's introduction (performed by Joseph "Lucky" Scott and "Master" Henry Gibson, respectively) have repeatedly been sampled in songs including Beastie Boys' "Egg Man", The Notorious B.I.G.'s "Ready to Die Intro", Goldie Lookin Chain's "Pusherman" and Nelly's "Tilt Ya Head Back" featuring Christina Aguilera. Mayfield himself sampled the original song in "Superfly 1990", a duet he recorded with rapper Ice-T.

Chart history

Weekly charts

Year-end charts

Later uses
"Superfly" was sampled at the end of the 1973 break-in record, "Super Fly Meets Shaft" (US #31).

The song appeared in the 2009 film Madea Goes to Jail, the 2012 film Dark Shadows, and the 2019 supernatural horror film The Curse of La Llorona.

Covers
"Superfly" was sampled in the 1973 break-in record, "Super Fly Meets Shaft" (US #31).

The song was sampled by hip hop group Outkast on their 1998 album Aquemini on the track "Return of the 'G'".

The song was covered by Canadian soul and R&B band jacksoul on their 2006 album mySOUL.

References

External links
 

Film theme songs
1972 singles
Funk songs
Songs about drugs
Songs about fictional male characters
Songs written for films
Curtis Mayfield songs
Songs written by Curtis Mayfield
Song recordings produced by Curtis Mayfield
Grammy Award for Best Remixed Recording, Non-Classical